Joseph or Joe Richardson may refer to:

 Joseph Richardson (American politician) (1778–1871), United States Representative from Massachusetts
 Joseph Richardson (Liberal politician) (1830–1902), Liberal Party politician in England, MP for South East Durham in the 1890s
 Joseph Richardson (1755–1803), journalist, poet and MP for Newport, Cornwall 1796–1803
 Joseph Richardson (musician) (1790–1855), English musician
 Joseph Richardson (cricketer) (1878–1951), Australian cricketer
 Joseph Richardson (English artist) 
 Joseph Richardson Sr. (1711–1784), American silversmith
 Joseph Richardson Jr. (1752–1831), American silversmith
 Joe Richardson (footballer, born 1908) (1908–1977), English footballer
 Joe Richardson (footballer, born 1942) (1942–1966), English footballer
 Joe Richardson (rugby league) (1879–1904), English rugby league player
 Joe M. Richardson (?-2015), author and history professor